The Flintstones were a group of three basketball players from Flint, Michigan, who helped lead the Michigan State Spartans to the 2000 NCAA Division I Men's National Championship. Originally, there were four members of "The Flintstones", but Antonio Smith graduated in 1999.

The name of the Flintstones rose to prominence during the successful run of Michigan State basketball including three consecutive Final Fours and a national championship. The four made up the core nucleus of the team. The players also sported tattoos bearing the name Flint, along with a basketball on their upper arms.

The name has since expanded to become popular to be used to refer to other basketball players, other athletes, and Flint natives.

The original Michigan State University "Flintstones" were Morris Peterson, Mateen Cleaves, Charlie Bell, Anthony Mull, and Antonio Smith.

References

1999–2000 Big Ten Conference men's basketball season
 
Basketball players from Flint, Michigan
Nicknamed groups of basketball players